The Mercedes-Benz F 200 "Imagination" coupe was a concept study by then Daimler-Benz unveiled at the 1996 Paris Motor Show. The goal was to show off innovations in control, design, and comfort in passenger cars. The car's exterior design was in part based on the, then, upcoming S-Class. This 2-door coupe also previewed the CL-Class coupe, which debuted in 1999.

Innovations
One of the unique innovations was the implementation of "Sidesticks". Sidesticks were a drive by joystick design (rather than the conventional steering wheel and gas/brake pedals) that could be toggled between the driver and passenger. Other innovations included:
Butterfly doors (to be utilized in the later Mercedes-Benz 2003 SLR McLaren)
Electro-transparent panoramic roof glass (to be utilized in the later 2002 Maybach 62)
Video cameras in the place of rear view mirrors. 
Window-Airbag (series launch in the Mercedes-Benz S-Class (W220)).
Forward-looking dynamic handling control system
A very significant feature was the Active Body Control fully active suspension, which entered series production on another coupe, the CL-Class in 1999.
Headlight system featuring variable light distribution. Production launch as bi-xenon headlights with Active Light Function in 2003 on the Mercedes-Benz E-Class (W211)
Voice recognition for mobile phone. Production launch under the name LINGUATRONIC in the Mercedes-Benz S-Class (W140) in 1996.

Urban legend fame 
In the early 2000s, the F 200 gained popularity as pictures of it were being mass mailed out under the subject of "The New Benz - very different... really different!". Many of the emails incorrectly claimed the car to be the new "SCL600". The intent of the email was to draw sarcasm from the radical designs of the car and its Sidesticks control system.

External links

http://www.daimler.com/dccom/0-5-1276316-1-1276333-1-0-0-1320821-0-0-0-0-0-0-0-0-0-0-0.html F 200 Imagination (1996) Daimler Official press kit
 Official press release and pictures via SeriousWheels.com
 The F 200 email chains via Urban Legends

References 

F200